Haizhou Emperor Guan Temple, or Haizhou Guandi Temple, is a temple located in Haizhou Town, Yanhu District, Yuncheng City, Shanxi Province. It is hailed as "the grand ancestor of temples dedicated to Guan Yu" (关庙之祖). The Temple is the largest extant palace-style Taoist complex and martial temple in China.

Haizhou Emperor Guan Temple is the largest Emperor Guan Temple (关帝庙) in China. It has a total area of 220,000 square meters, with more than 200 rooms.

History
Haizhou Emperor Guan Temple was established in the ninth year of Kaihuang (开皇) in the Sui Dynasty (589), expanded and rebuilt in the Song Dynasty and Ming Dynasty. 

Haizhou Emperor Guan Temple was destroyed by fire in the forty-first year of Kangxi (1702) in the Qing Dynasty and was restored after more than ten years.

Conservations
In 1957, Haizhou Emperor Guan Temple was designated by the Shanxi Provincial People's Government as the first batch of provincial-level key cultural relics protection units in Shanxi Province.

In 1988, Haizhou Emperor Guan Temple was listed as a Major Historical and Cultural Site Protected at the National Level in China.

References

Guandi temples
Taoist temples in China
6th-century establishments in China
Buildings and structures completed in the 6th century
Historic buildings and structures
Major National Historical and Cultural Sites in Shanxi
Buildings and structures in Yuncheng
Tourist attractions in Yuncheng